Taurekareka "Tau" Henare (1878 – 12 January 1940) was a Māori member of the New Zealand Parliament from 1914 to 1938, sitting for the Reform Party for most of that time, until it merged with the United Party to form the National Party in 1936.

Background and early life
Henare was born at Pipiwai in the Bay of Islands, in 1878 (probably) or 1877. His father, Henare Wynyard, was said to be the son of Robert Wynyard, acting governor of New Zealand. Henare was initially given the name Taurekareka Wynyard, but later adopted his father's first name as his own surname — this was likely because Robert Wynyard had been active in fighting against Māori, and his grandson, raised as Maori, did not wish to bear his name. Henare was also closely related to a number of prominent figures of Māori history, including Hone Heke. He was a member of the Ngāpuhi iwi, and his strongest affinity was with the Ngāti Hine hapū.

Henare had no formal education in the Western sense, but was taught Māori lore and traditions. He was raised for a time by Wi Pere (later to serve in Parliament) on the East Coast, but later returned north, possibly to avoid an arranged marriage. In 1903, Henare married Hera Paerata, whose mother was Māori and father was a member of the Subritzky family from Poland.

Political life

In the 1914 election, Henare stood for the conservative Reform Party in the Northern Maori electorate of the Parliament, and won.  He did not often participate in parliamentary debates, but was heavily involved in policy related to Māori interests. He worked closely with Āpirana Ngata, a member of the Liberal Party, on a number of important issues, and took part in the consolidation of Māori lands in the North Auckland area.

In World War I, Henare argued against conscription of Māori, and suggested that the return of confiscated lands might persuade Māori to volunteer. He also helped Māori soldiers re-establish themselves upon their return from the war. In the influenza epidemic of 1918 he assisted the delivery of healthcare to Māori. Henare's wife was among the casualties of the epidemic. Henare also played a role in shaping Reform Party policy on Māori issues. He supported the efforts of Gordon Coates, then Minister of Native Affairs, to expand the role of his department, and promoted reforms of the Māori school system.

Henare remained in Parliament until the 1938 election, when he was defeated by Paraire Karaka Paikea of the Labour Party who was affiliated with the Labour-aligned Rātana movement, whose rise Henare had opposed.

Legacy
Henare died in 1940 at his farm near Kawakawa.  He was survived by six sons and two daughters. His son, Sir James Henare, was a prominent military officer, and his daughter, Ihapera Taua, was an important figure in the Māori Women's Welfare League.

Two of this great-grandsons later served as members of the New Zealand Parliament: Tau Henare (as an MP for New Zealand First, then Mauri Pacific and later the National Party) and Peeni Henare (as an MP for the Labour Party).

References

The First 50 Years: A History of the New Zealand National Party by Barry Gustafson (1986, Reed Methuen, Auckland; biographical appendix of National MPs, page 320) 

1870s births
1940 deaths
New Zealand farmers
Reform Party (New Zealand) MPs
New Zealand MPs for Māori electorates
New Zealand people of World War I
Ngāpuhi people
Ngāti Hine people
Māori politicians
People from Kawakawa, New Zealand
Members of the New Zealand House of Representatives
Unsuccessful candidates in the 1938 New Zealand general election